Jams (also titled as N.E.G. Jams) is a studio album released on December 12, 1995, by the Washington, D.C.-based go-go band Northeast Groovers. The album consists of ten tracks, including the singles "N.E.G Jam", "I Can See Clearly Now", and "Go Hard".

Track listing

"N.E.G. Jam" – 6:41
"Freak-A-Dek Dug" – 5:43
"I Can See Clearly Now" – 8:00
"O' Yeah" – 4:39
"Like Mike" – 3:56
"Go Hard" – 5:17
"Get Your Hands in the Air" – 7:24
"Funky Now" – 4:05
"Scream On It" – 5:16
"Tear the Roof Off This Mutha" – 9:31

Personnel
Khari Pratt – bass guitar
Lamond "Maestro" Perkins – keyboards
Ronald "88" Utley – keyboards
David "32" Ellis– vocals
Leonard "Daddy-O" Huggins – vocals
Ronald "Dig-Dug" Dixon – percussions
Christian “Rah Rah" Black – vocals
Samuel "Smoke" Dews – congas, percussions
"Jammin" Jeff Warren – drums

References

External links
Jams at Discogs

1995 albums
Northeast Groovers albums